Princess Suraya Jah, Nawab Gowhar-i-Taj, Abida Sultan Begum Sahiba (28 August 1913 – 11 May 2002) was the eldest daughter of Hamidullah Khan, the last Nawab of the Bhopal state, and his wife Begum Maimoona Sultan.

Life and family

Sultan is the daughter of Hamidullah Khan, the Nawab of Bhopal and Begum Maimoona Sultan. She was the eldest of three children; she had two younger sisters Sajida Sultan, and Rabia Sultan. The Begum of Bhopal, Sultan Jahan, was her grandmother, and her predecessor Shah Jahan Begum was her great-grandmother. The cricketer Iftikhar Ali Khan Pataudi was her brother-in-law through his marriage to Sajida, and the cricketer Mansoor Ali Khan Pataudi is her nephew.

In 1926 she married Nawab Mohammad Sarwar Ali Khan, ruler of Kurwai State. In 1928, she was recognized as the heiress apparent to the Bhopal throne.  However, she gave up her right to the throne and migrated to the newly formed Pakistan in 1950.

In Pakistan, she joined the foreign service. Therefore, the Government of India excluded her from the succession and her younger sister Sajida succeeded her instead upon her father's death in 1960, although Abida Sultan contested the succession in court.

Abida Sultan had arrived in the newly created Pakistan at the age of 37, with a young son. She was to spend the greater part of her life in Pakistan.  She died in Karachi in 2002.  Her son, Shaharyar Khan, was to become the Foreign Secretary of Pakistan and then the Chairman of the Pakistan Cricket Board.

References

History of Bhopal
People from Bhopal
Muhajir people
1913 births
2002 deaths
People from Karachi
Pakistani princesses